The 1906 Major League Baseball season was contested from April 12 to October 14, 1906. The Chicago Cubs and Chicago White Sox were the regular season champions of the National League and American League, respectively. The White Sox then defeated the Cubs in the World Series, four games to two.

Season information 
The Chicago Cubs won a record 116 games while losing only 36.  Their .763 winning percentage remains the highest in the modern (two-league) era. They were led offensively by third baseman Harry Steinfeldt whose 176 hits, .327 batting average and 83 RBIs were all a team-best; Steinfeldt also had 29 stolen bases.  The Cubs' pitching staff consisted of Ed Reulbach, Carl Lundgren, Mordecai Brown and left-hander Jack Pfiester.

Standings

American League

National League

Postseason

Bracket

Events 
 September 26 – After being held scoreless for 48 consecutive innings, the Philadelphia Athletics finally score on a two-run double by Harry Davis, but still lose to the Cleveland Naps 5-3.

Managers

American League

National League

References

External links
1906 in baseball history from ThisGreatGame.com
1906 Major League Baseball season schedule at Baseball Reference

 
Major League Baseball seasons